D30 is a state road in central Croatia connecting Velika Gorica, Petrinja and Hrvatska Kostajnica to Croatian motorway network at the A3 motorway Kosnica interchange and to the City of Zagreb via Radnička Road.

The road, as well as all other state roads in Croatia, is managed and maintained by Hrvatske ceste, state owned company.

Traffic volume 

Traffic is regularly counted and reported by Hrvatske ceste, operator of the road. Sections of the road running through Velika Gorica and Petrinja are not covered by the traffic counting sites, but the section is assumed to carry a substantial volume of urban traffic in addition to the regular D30 traffic.

Road junctions and populated areas 

{| class="wikitable" 
|-
| colspan="2"  style="text-align:center; background:blue; margin-top:15;"| D30 junctions/populated areas
|-  style="text-align:center; background:#00c0f0;"
|| Type
|| Slip roads/Notes
|-
| 
| Kosnica interchange A3 to Slavonski Brod and Varaždin (via the A4 motorway) (to the east) and to Karlovac (via the A1 motorway) and Krapina (via the A2 motorway) (to the west).To Zagreb via Radnička Road.Both the D31 to the south of the interchange and Radnička Road to the north are double carriage roadsThe northern terminus of the road.
|-
| 
|  D408 to Velika Gorica and Zagreb Airport.
|-
| 
|  D31 to Pokupsko and Glina (D6).To Velika Gorica via Sisačka street.The southern terminus of the suburban double carriage road.
|-
| 
| Vukovina
|-
| 
| Buševec
|-
| 
| Ogulinec
|-
| 
| PeščenicaŽ3151 to Brežane Lekeničke and Cerje.Ž3292 to Peščenica railway station.
|-
| 
| Lekenik
|-
| 
| Ž3230 to Poljana Lekenička
|-
| 
| DužicaŽ3157 to Greda.
|-
| 
|  D36 to Pokupsko and Karlovac (to the west).The D30 and D36 roads are concurrent to the south of the junction.
|-
| 
| Ž3156 to Žažina
|-
| 
|  D36 to Sisak and A3 motorway Popovača interchange (to the east).The D30 and D36 roads are concurrent to the north of the junction.
|-
| 
| Ž3156 to Mala Gorica
|-
| 
| Brest PokupskiŽ3242 to Vurot, Stara Drenčina and Staro Pračno.
|-
| 
|  D37 to Glina.The D30 and D37 roads are concurrent to the east of the junction.
|-
| 
| Petrinja D37 to Sisak .The D30 and D37 roads are concurrent to the west of the junction.Ž3200 to D37 state road.
|-
| 
| Donja Budičina
|-
| 
| Ž3201 to Donja Mlinoga
|-
| 
| Moštanica
|-
| 
| BlinjaŽ3208 to Mađari.
|-
| 
| Bijelnik
|-
| 
| Ž3240 to Gornja Mlinoga
|-
| 
| Ž3244 to Mala Gradusa and Drljača.
|-
| 
| Knezovljani
|-
| 
| Umetić
|-
| 
| Ž3241 to Mečenčani and Borojevići.
|-
| 
| Donji Kukuruzari
|-
| 
| Panjani D224 to Sunja and Mošćenica (D37).
|-
| 
| Hrvatska Kostajnica D47 to Dvor, Hrvatska Dubica and the A3 motorway Novska interchange.
|-
| 
| Hrvatska Kostajnica border crossing to Bosnia and Herzegovina.The road extends to Bosanska Kostajnica, Bosnia and Herzegovina.The southern terminus of the road.

Maps

Sources

D030
D030
D030
D030